Scarborough University Technical College is a mixed University Technical College located in Scarborough, North Yorkshire, England. It opened in 2016 and caters for students aged 14–18 years. It is located on Weaponness Coach Park, in a purpose-built building.

The lead education partner for the UTC is the University of Hull, and it is also supported by businesses such as McCain, Unison Ltd, Alpamare, Castle, Deep Sea Electronics, Firmac, Flamingo Land, GCHQ, Plaxton (ADL), Schneider Electric Ltd, Severfield, SWC Trade Frames and Sirius Minerals, as well as Scarborough Borough Council.

References

External links 
 Scarborough University Technical College

Secondary schools in North Yorkshire
Educational institutions established in 2016
2016 establishments in England
University Technical Colleges